Micalvi Cove is a 1.9 km wide cove indenting for 1.35 km the southwest coast of Robert Island in the South Shetland Islands, Antarctica next northwest of Kermen Peninsula, and entered between Edwards Point and Zahari Point.  Avren Rocks are situated in the interior of the cove.  The area was visited by early 19th century sealers.

The feature is named after the cutter Micalvi which took part in one of the Chilean Antarctic expeditions.

Location

See also
 Robert Island
 South Shetland Islands

Maps
 L.L. Ivanov et al. Antarctica: Livingston Island and Greenwich Island, South Shetland Islands. Scale 1:100000 topographic map. Sofia: Antarctic Place-names Commission of Bulgaria, 2005.
 L.L. Ivanov. Antarctica: Livingston Island and Greenwich, Robert, Snow and Smith Islands. Scale 1:120000 topographic map.  Troyan: Manfred Wörner Foundation, 2009.

References
 SCAR Composite Antarctic Gazetteer.

Coves of Robert Island